John Morse may refer to:
John Morse (golfer) (born 1958), American golfer
John Morse (Colorado politician) (born 1954),  former Colorado State Senate president, recalled in 2013
John Morse (British politician) (born 1951), far right British politician
John Hollingsworth Morse (1910–1988), film director
John F. Morse (1801–1884), American politician in Ohio
John Torrey Morse (1840–1937), American historian and biographer
John Morse (Massachusetts politician), representative to the Great and General Court

See also